Team Jumbo–Visma is a Dutch professional bicycle racing team, successor of the former Rabobank. The team consists of four sections: ProTeam (the UCI WorldTeam team), Women's Team (the UCI Women's Team), Development Team (a UCI Continental team racing in the UCI Europe Tour), and Cyclo-cross.

The cycling team was founded for the 1984 season under the name Kwantum–Decosol, anchored by Jan Raas, with mostly cyclists coming from the TI–Raleigh cycling team. With Raas as directeur sportif from 1985 onwards, the head sponsor was succeeded by Superconfex, Buckler, WordPerfect and Novell, respectively, before Raas signed a contract with Rabobank, a Dutch association of credit unions, in 1996. After Rabobank sponsorship ended in 2012, it was known as Blanco, Belkin, Lotto-Jumbo and eventually Jumbo–Visma.

Since 1984, the team has entered every Tour de France and since the introduction of divisions in 1998, the team has always been in the first division.  A 2012 investigation by Dutch newspaper de Volkskrant concluded that doping was at least tolerated, from the team's 1996 beginnings as Rabobank until at least 2007.

Team Jumbo-Visma cyclist Jonas Vingegaard won the 2022 Tour de France, delivering the team its first Tour de France victory in the General Classification, as well as the King of the Mountains title while his team-mate Wout van Aert won the Points Classification title.

History
In road bicycle racing, teams usually take their names from their main sponsors. Team Jumbo–Visma has previously had the following sponsors, and thus names.

Kwantum–Decosol–Yoko (1984–1986)
After the season of 1983, the TI–Raleigh team split up because of tension between former world champion Jan Raas and team leader Peter Post, with seven cyclists following Post to the new Panasonic-team and six cyclists joining Raas to the Kwantum team.  The team captains of the Kwantum team were Guillaume Driessens, Jan Gisbers and Walter Godefroot. In their first year, the team managed to win the intermediate sprints classification and one stage in the 1984 Tour de France, the Amstel Gold Race and the Dutch national road championship. After the 1984 season, Jan Raas stopped as an active cyclist and became team manager. In 1985 the Kwantum team had a successful year. Victories included two Tour de France stages, the Tour of Luxembourg, Paris–Tours, Paris–Brussels, the Tirreno–Adriatico, the Tour of Belgium, again the Dutch national road championship, and the World cycling championship (Joop Zoetemelk).
1986 was less successful; the most important victory was Tour of Belgium.

Superconfex–Yoko–Colnago (1987–1989)
For the 1987 season, the main sponsor became Superconfex. In that year, the team was officially known as Superconfex – Kwantum – Yoko – Colnago. Jan Raas remained the team leader. After a victory in Kuurne–Brussels–Kuurne for Ludo Peeters, the new sprinter Jean-Paul van Poppel (coming from the Skala cycling team) gave the team a great year, with five stage wins in the Tour de France (of which two for van Poppel) and the victory in the points classification in the Tour de France for Jean-Paul van Poppel. Joop Zoetemelk ended his career with a victory in the Amstel Gold Race.

From 1988 on, the team was known as Superconfex – Yoko – Opel – Colnago. 1988 was also a successful season for the team, with victories in Paris–Brussels, the Tour of Ireland, the Tour of Belgium, the Amstel Gold Race, and six stages in the Tour de France.
In the 1989 season, Jean-Paul van Poppel changed to the Panasonic team. In 1989 his sprinting capacities were missed, and the number of victories was reduced. Still, Paris–Brussels, the Tour of Flanders and Paris–Tours were won, together with two stages in the 1989 Tour de France.

Buckler–Colnago–Decca (1990–1992)

After the 1989 season, the main sponsoring was taken over by Buckler. The Tour of Belgium was won again, and the Ronde van Nederland was won as well. That year, the team had the winner of the Dutch national road race championships again, as Peter Winnen won the race.
In 1991, the team won the Amstel Gold Race, the Ronde van Nederland and Tour of Flanders. The team had taken over Steven Rooks from the Panasonic team, who immediately became the Dutch national road race champion.
The worst year in the team's history was 1992. Only 26 races were won in the season, compared to 64 victories in the successful 1988 season. 1992 also saw a young Erik Dekker entering the team. After that season, Buckler decided to stop sponsoring.

Wordperfect–Colnago–Decca (1993–1994)

A new sponsor was found in WordPerfect. Steven Rooks left the team, Raúl Alcalá joined the team. Still, the 1993 season did not turn out a great season, with only 29 victories, the most important being Three Days of De Panne and the Tour DuPont.
In 1993 and 1994, Michael Boogerd and Léon van Bon started their professional career in the team, and Viatcheslav Ekimov also came. The Tour DuPont was won again, together with the Tour de Luxembourg. The year still was disappointing with only 25 victories.

Novell–Decca (1995)
In 1995, the team was joined by Djamolidine Abdoujaparov, the winner of the points classification in the 1994 Tour de France. Abdoujaparov won one stage in the Tour de France, but other than that, the year was still not what the sponsors had hoped, so a new sponsor had to be found. The title sponsor of the previous two years, WordPerfect, was a product of Novell Software, which carried the team's name this one season.

Rabobank (1996–2012)

Raas became the team manager of the Rabobank team while Theo de Rooy, Adrie van Houwelingen and Zoetemelk were directeur sportifs. As a Dutch cycling team, the team signed many of the prominent Dutch cyclists of the 1990s including Adri van der Poel, Richard Groenendaal and Erik Breukink as well as keeping the prominent Dutch cyclists from the Novell team that included Léon van Bon, Erik Dekker and Michael Boogerd. In addition, the team had many successful cyclists of other nationalities such as Edwig van Hooydonck, Rolf Sørensen, Johan Bruyneel and Robbie McEwen.

The Rabobank team dominated the Dutch national championships over several disciplines, and had world champions in both cyclo-cross (Adri van der Poel in 1996, Richard Groenendaal in 2000 and Sven Nys in 2004) and road racing (Óscar Freire in 2004).

In the 2000 cyclo-cross world championships there was a conflict between the commercial team interests and the national team interests. Groenendaal attacked during the first lap and was chased by defending cyclo-cross world champion Mario De Clercq who was followed by Groenendaal's Rabobank teammate Sven Nys. Team manager Jan Raas allegedly told Nys not to cooperate in the chase and De Clercq was unable to catch Groenendaal. Nys received much criticism from the Belgian team manager Erik De Vlaeminck as well as the Belgian public.

Jan Raas was the team manager for the first eight years of the team's existence. In 2003 Raas was removed rather abruptly which surprised the other members of staff including Theo De Rooy, Erik Dekker and Michael Boogerd. De Rooy was promoted to team manager and a former Rabobank rider, who had been working as a PR man for Rabobank, Erik Breukink, was named as the new directeur sportif to replace De Rooy. In August 2007 in the aftermath of the affair in which Michael Rasmussen was removed during the 2007 Tour de France, De Rooy resigned from his position as team manager.

Following the United States Anti-Doping Agency (USADA) report on doping in professional cycling in October 2012, Rabobank announced it would end its sponsorship of professional cycling at the end of 2012.  Rabobank said that doping was so rampant that it was "no longer convinced the international professional world of cycling can make this a clean and fair sport."

Blanco then Belkin (2013–2014)

The team was able to continue, as Rabobank agreed to fund the team during 2013 until a new sponsor could be found. The deadline for finding new sponsorship was the end of the 2013 UCI World Tour. Racing under the name Blanco to refer to its formally unsponsored status, Tom-Jelte Slagter of the team won its first stage race, the 2013 Tour Down Under.

Belkin was announced as the team's new sponsor in June 2013 with a -year deal, however in June 2014 they announced that they were exercising a clause in their contract to end their sponsorship of the team at the end of the 2014 season, forcing the team to find a new backer for the second time in 18 months. Subsequently, in July 2014 it was announced that the team had signed a formal declaration of intent with the Dutch lottery Lotto and marketing agency BrandLoyalty which would ensure their backing for two years, with an option for an additional two years. As part of the deal the cycling team would join forces with the BrandLoyalty speed skating team managed by Jac Orie and featuring Olympic and World Champions Sven Kramer and Stefan Groothuis.

LottoNL–Jumbo (2015–2018)

In June 2014 it was announced that Belkin would stop sponsoring the cycling team. On 20 July 2014, the team announced they had an agreement in place with the Brand Loyalty skating team. A day later, the team also released the news that the Dutch Lotto will also sponsor the team. On 29 September 2014, the contracts were signed between the two teams, meaning that the new name would be TEAMLottoNL, with the renaming taking effect from 1 January 2015. On 23 October 2014, the team was unveiled in Utrecht as Team LottoNL–Jumbo showing their new black and yellow team kit. Lotto had previously been confirmed as the team's title sponsor, supermarket chain, Jumbo, was presented as the second sponsor of the WorldTour team. In September the team confirmed they would continue to ride on Bianchi bikes for the 2016 and 2017 seasons. On the first rest day of the 2016 Tour de France, the team announced LottoNL had agreed to extend their sponsorship of the team through to the end of the 2018 season.

Jumbo–Visma (2019–)

After signing a new sponsorship deal with Visma, a Norwegian software company, the team was renamed to Team Jumbo–Visma on 1 January 2019. From the start of 2021, the team has a new bicycle sponsor, Cervélo, and the team is equipped with disc brakes instead of rim brakes.

Road racing team
The road racing team has won several Classics such as the Tour of Flanders in 1997, Championship of Hamburg in 1998, the Amstel Gold Race in 1999 and 2001, Paris–Tours in 1999, 2004 and 2010, Clásica de San Sebastián in 2000 and Milan–San Remo in 2004, 2007 and 2010. Erik Dekker won the UCI World Cup in 2001 due to his Classic win and high placings in many of the classics.

Rabobank becoming a Grand Tour team

The team signed American Levi Leipheimer in 2002 as a rider for the Tour de France. Leipheimer finished eighth in his first Tour but crashed out of the race on the first stage of the 2003 Tour de France. Leipheimer finished ninth overall the following year. The team became more of a Grand Tour team as could be seen by Michael Rasmussen's win in the Mountains Classification of the 2005 Tour de France. When Denis Menchov took the lead in the 2005 Vuelta a España, he was not expecting to be competing for the overall classification The Rabobank team at that year's Vuelta were not seen as particularly strong or able to assist Menchov in the mountain stages. Menchov finished second to Roberto Heras which was the highest placing of a Rabobank team rider at a grand tour after Michael Boogerd's fifth place in the 1998 Tour de France. Heras was later disqualified for doping and Menchov was made the winner. The following year Menchov focused on the Tour de France where the team rode strongly with Menchov, Boogerd, and Rasmussen.

During the 2007 Tour de France, Rabobank fired Michael Rasmussen (2005 Tour de France, 2006 Tour de France K.O.M.) for code-violations while he was in the yellow jersey. The remaining riders of the Rabobank team were given the choice to start the 17th stage without Michael Rasmussen, or to withdraw. That evening they decided to withdraw, but the team changed its mind and announced the following morning that the riders would be starting the 17th stage. Although he started with the rest of the team, Denis Menchov (team leader on the road, who deferred to Rasmussen when the latter seemed to have a better chance at winning) abandoned the race in the middle of the stage.

The Rabobank team was invited for the 2008 Tour de France. Denis Menchov had decided to focus on the Tour de France. To do that, he did not defend his Vuelta a España-title, and rode the 2008 Giro d'Italia as preparation for the Tour de France. Menchov finished 4th place in the 2008 Tour de France, and Óscar Freire won the points classification. The team had to wait until 2009 for the first successes in the Giro d'Italia, when Denis Menchov won two stages; a mountain finish and a time trial. This second win earned him the pink leader jersey, which the team defended to the end of the race, earning Menchov, and Rabobank, their third Grand Tour GC win.

Affiliated teams
 Women's road team: Team Jumbo–Visma (women's team) (current); Rabo–Liv Women Cycling Team (former)
 Men's development team: Jumbo–Visma Development Team (current); Rabobank Development Team (former)

Cyclo-cross team
The Rabobank cyclo-cross team has dominated the sport in the past with Sven Nys and Richard Groenendaal winning the General Classification competitions such as the Superprestige, the World Cup and the Gazet van Antwerpen trophy over the last eight years. Groenendaal dominated the Dutch cyclo-cross championships for many years. Groenendaal left the team after the 2006–2007 season. He was at that time one of the few remaining Rabobank riders from the 1996 team. Lars Boom joined the team in 2002 as a junior cyclo-cross rider and has already achieved success in the Elite cyclo-cross championships as well as showing promise riding in the UCI Europe Tour with the Rabobank Continental team.

Sponsorship

Rabobank announced in October 2012 that it would end its sponsorship of professional cycling at the end of the year, with the team announcing its intention to continue as a ‘white label’ under a new foundation yet to be established. On 13 December 2012 it was announced the team would participate in 2013 under the Blanco name, with the intention to find a sponsor for 2014 or to stop the team otherwise.

During the 2013 Giro d'Italia it emerged that the technology firm Belkin was a possible new sponsor. The deal was confirmed towards the end of May 2013, and the team's new identity was launched a week before the 2013 Tour de France.

The team formerly rode Colnago frames but as of 1 January 2009 began a two-year contract riding Giant frames equipped with Shimano components. Starting in 2014, Bianchi supplies the team bicycles. The team began a two-year contract (2014–2016) wearing Santini SMS clothing.

A deal was subsequently struck for consumer electronics company Belkin to take on sponsorship from the 2013 Tour de France until the end of 2015. In 2015 Lotto, a Dutch lottery, agreed to sponsor the Team for four years. As of 2015, the team is also sponsored by a Dutch supermarket chain, Jumbo. The "NL" was added to the team's name to differentiate it from Lotto–Soudal, a ProTeam that is sponsored by the national lottery of Belgium. In 2019, the Team began a long-term contract with a Business software provider Visma for at least five years, therefore becoming Team Jumbo–Visma. From 2021 team will have new bicycle partnership with Cervélo, ending previous sponsorship with Bianchi lasting from 2014 to 2020.

Doping accusations
According to a 2012 investigation by de Volkskrant, doping was used by Rabobank riders since 1998 and condoned by the team, with team physicians actively monitoring the health of those riders. According to Stefan Matschiner, a key witness in the Humanplasma scandal, three (former) Rabobank riders were customers of the Swiss blood doping expert. Matschiner mentioned Michael Boogerd, the most successful Dutch Rabobank rider, and said one other team member was a customer. Theo de Rooij, Rabo's manager since 2003 and responsible for pulling Michael Rasmussen from the 2007 Tour de France, did not deny doping was used by team riders, but said that the use of doping was neither suggested nor paid for by the team. In the 2015 USADA report against Dr. Geert Leinders, it was found that he, and other team doctors, supported and organized a blood doping program within the team for much of the 2000s, which included EPO, blood transfusions, hGH, and cortisones. Riders included in the report that doped during their Rabobank tenure include Denis Menchov, Michael Boogerd, Michael Rasmussen, and Levi Leipheimer.

Team roster

Major wins

National, continental, world, and Olympic champions

1984
 Netherlands Road Race, Jan Raas
1985
 Netherlands Road Race, Jacques Hanegraaf
 World Road Race, Joop Zoetemelk
1989
 Netherlands Road Race, Frans Maassen
1990
 Netherlands Road Race, Peter Winnen
1991
 Netherlands Road Race, Steven Rooks
1996
 World Cyclo-cross, Adri van der Poel
 Netherlands Time Trial, Erik Dekker
1997
 Netherlands Road Race, Michael Boogerd
 Netherlands Time Trial, Erik Breukink
1998
 U23 World Cyclo-cross, Sven Nys
 Netherlands Road Race, Michael Boogerd
 Netherlands Time Trial, Patrick Jonker
  Switzerland Time Trial, Beat Zberg
 Austria Time Trial, Peter Luttenberger
1999
 Netherlands Road Race, Maarten den Bakker
2000
 Belgium Cyclo-cross, Sven Nys
 World Cyclo-cross, Richard Groenendaal
 Netherlands Road Race, Léon van Bon
 Switzerland Road Race, Markus Zberg
 Netherlands Time Trial, Erik Dekker
2002
 U23 World Cyclo-cross, Thijs Verhagen
 Netherlands Time Trial, Erik Dekker
 Belgium Time Trial, Marc Wauters
2003
 Belgium Cyclo-cross, Sven Nys
 Netherlands Time Trial, Maarten den Bakker
 Belgium Time Trial, Marc Wauters
2004
 Netherlands Road Race, Erik Dekker
 Netherlands Time Trial, Thomas Dekker
 Finland Time Trial, Jukka Vastaranta
 World Road Race, Óscar Freire
2005
 Belgium Cyclo-cross, Sven Nys
 World Cyclo-cross, Sven Nys
 Netherlands Time Trial, Thomas Dekker
 Belgium Time Trial, Marc Wauters
2006
 Belgium Cyclo-cross, Sven Nys
 U23 World Cyclo-cross, Lars Boom
 Netherlands Road Race, Michael Boogerd
2007
 U23 World Time Trial, Lars Boom
 Netherlands Road Race, Koos Moerenhout
2008
 Belgium Cyclo-cross, Sven Nys
 World Cyclo-cross, Lars Boom
 Netherlands Road Race, Lars Boom
2009
 Netherlands Cyclo-cross, Lars Boom
 Netherlands Road Race, Koos Moerenhout
 Netherlands Time Trial, Stef Clement
2010
 Netherlands Cyclo-cross, Lars Boom
 Netherlands Time Trial, Jos van Emden
2011
 Netherlands Cyclo-cross, Lars Boom
 Netherlands Time Trial, Stef Clement
 Spain Time Trial, Luis León Sánchez
2012
 Netherlands Cyclo-cross, Lars Boom
 Spain Time Trial, Luis León Sánchez
2013
 Norway Cyclo-cross, Lars Petter Nordhaug
2015
 Netherlands Time Trial, Wilco Kelderman
2016
 Slovenia Time Trial, Primož Roglič
 Belgium Time Trial, Victor Campenaerts
 Netherlands Road Race, Dylan Groenewegen
2017
 European Time Trial, Victor Campenaerts
2019
 Netherlands Time Trial, Jos van Emden
 Belgium Time Trial, Wout van Aert
 Germany Time Trial, Tony Martin
 Norway Road Race, Amund Grøndahl Jansen
2020
 Slovenia Road Race, Primož Roglič
 Belgium Time Trial, Wout van Aert
2021
 Belgium Cyclo-cross, Wout van Aert
 New Zealand Road Race, George Bennett
 Netherlands Time Trial, Tom Dumoulin
 Norway Time Trial, Tobias Foss
 Germany Time Trial, Tony Martin
 Netherlands Road Race, Timo Roosen
 Norway Road Race, Tobias Foss
 Belgium Road Race, Wout van Aert
 Olympic Time Trial, Primož Roglič
2022 
 Belgium Cyclo-cross, Wout van Aert
 Australia Time Trial, Rohan Dennis
 Norway Time Trial, Tobias Foss
 Netherlands Road Race, Pascal Eenkhoorn
 World Time Trial, Tobias Foss

References

External links
	
 Official website
 Rabobank results since 1996 

 
UCI WorldTeams
Cycling teams based in the Netherlands
Cycling teams established in 1984
1984 establishments in the Netherlands